Armaillé is a commune in the Maine-et-Loire department in western France.

Geography
The village lies on the right bank of the Verzée, which flows east-southeast through the commune.

Population

See also
Communes of the Maine-et-Loire department

References

Communes of Maine-et-Loire